Anthony "Tony" O'Brien (born 1940) is an Irish retired hurler who played as a corner-back and full-back with the Limerick senior team.

References

1940 births
Living people
Patrickswell hurlers
Limerick inter-county hurlers